For the song by British heavy metal band Rainbow, see Stargazer (Rainbow song)

Stargazer (stylized as STARGAZER) is an extended play (EP) marketed as the second single of Japanese boy group JO1, formed through the reality competition show Produce 101 Japan. It also served as the second single for their first studio album The Star (2020). Consisting of a total of six songs that mostly fall in house, hip-hop, EDM, and trap genres, the EP single was released by Lapone Entertainment into three different physical editions and one digital edition on August 26, 2020, with "Oh-Eh-Oh" as the lead track. The single features participation by members Sho Yonashiro and Ren Kawashiri in writing lyrics and choreography, respectively, for the first time as well as production by Hui from South Korean boy group Pentagon and others. It ranked at number one on Oricon Singles Chart and received a Platinum certification by the Recording Industry Association of Japan with "Oh-Eh-Oh" peaked atop the Billboard Japan Hot 100.

Background and release 
Following their debut single Protostar and performance in KCON:TACT, JO1 announced they would release their second single Stargazer on August 26, 2020. The cover images for the single were released on July 7, showing the members in school uniform embodying the single's concept: "A message from JO1 of the same generation as a teenager in distress. The teenagers who grow up through worries and hesitations, and finally meet their "shining self" one day." Meanwhile, the cover image of the limited edition B gives a glimpse of the adult side of the members wearing clothes from Louis Vuitton's 2020 pre-fall collection titled Arc of Boyhood.

Stargazer consists of a total of six songs that were released into three different physical editions with "Oh-Eh-Oh" served as the lead track. The first edition is a CD and DVD bundle limited edition that includes a making video of "Oh-Eh-Oh", a variety segment with members titled JO1 School and the group's version of the song "Kungchikita" that had been performed in Produce 101 Japan. The second edition is a CD and photo booklet bundle limited edition. The third edition is a normal CD-only edition. Besides "Oh-Eh-Oh", song "My Friends" written by the group's leader Yonashiro is also included in all types of the single. Meanwhile, a special edition of the single that includes all the songs was released for digital download and streaming.

To further promote the single, performance videos for "Go" and "So What" were also released. Special live streaming events were the held consecutively through the group's YouTube and TikTok accounts on the release day.

Conception and recording 
In their interview with Tokyo FM radio program Tokyo Speakeasy, Yonashiro and Ruki Shiroiwa said that they had to have lessons and record the single remotely due to the COVID-19 pandemic. For vocal and rap lessons, they're been given half to one hour a day with their trainers from South Korea singing to their smartphones. They also learnt the choreography by watching videos their trainers had sent to them. During the recording, the production team in South Korea guided them over the phone with the help of an interpreter.

About song "My Friends", Yonashiro stated that he had decided to write the lyrics then consulted it with their production team in South Korea during the recording of Protostar. He explained, "I wrote it with gratitude to the people I met at the audition (Produce 101 Japan), my members, and fans." Fellow member Kawashiri did the choreography for the song.

Lead track
The lead track, "Oh-Eh-Oh", is a song that combines EDM, house music, and vocal that reflects the determination to push into the future, creating an overwhelming sense of exhilaration. It was performed for the first time on Fuji TV's prime-time music program Hey!Hey!Neo! Music Champ on August 1, and the appearance of the name of Hui from the South Korean boy group Pentagon on the song credits gathered the public's attention. His agency, Cube Entertainment, later confirmed his participation in the production of the song. The music video was released on August 26 and directed by the Space Shower Music Awards Best Director Award winner Hidenobu Tanabe. It features a fighting scene between the members, acting as high school students, and a mysterious group with Kawashiri playing two roles.

Upon its release, "Oh-Eh-Oh" ranked at number one and thirty-three on Billboard Japan Hot 100 and Top Download Songs, respectively. It eventually earned eighty-second place on the Hot 100 Year-End chart. The song was used as an ending song for ABC TV's shows Sonna Koto Kangaetakoto Nakatta Quiz! Torinikku-tte Nanno Niku!? and Yasutomo no Itatte Shinken Desu as well as Kansai TV's Chacha Ire Monday for the month of September. It was then used as the theme song for ABC-Mart x Nike's digital campaign for Nike Court Vision, starting on November 26, 2020.

Promotion 
To promote the single, JO1 was featured on special programs on several music TV channels, such as Music On! TV, MTV Japan, and Space Shower TV. On September 5, the group performed songs "Go", "So What", and "Oh-Eh-Oh" as the headliner for the 31st Mynavi Tokyo Girls Collection Autumn/Winter 2020, the largest fashion event in Japan, held in Saitama Super Arena and streamed via Line Live. The news stating the group would be the headliner in the event trended on Twitter even before their appearance. The number of viewers peaked during their performance with an estimate of 270,000 viewers. On October 17, JO1 participated in the Korean wave convention KCON titled "KCON:TACT Season 2" from Japan for the second time. They performed songs from the single, such as "Oh-Eh-Oh", "Go" and "So What" as well as "Infinity" from their debut single. They also debuted "My Friends".

Commercial performance 
Upon its release, Stargazer ranked at number one on iTunes's real-time album charts in seven regions in addition to Japan, such as Thailand and Indonesia. The single debuted at number one on Oricon Daily Singles Chart with an estimate of 188,977 copies sold. It eventually ranked at number one on the weekly chart with 283,363 copies sold. This made JO1 the only artist with two consecutive wins on the chart since their debut single after Hinatazaka46 managed to do so with "Do Re Mi Sol La Si Do" on July 29, 2019. Subsequently, it ranked third on the monthly chart, and certified platinum by the Recording Industry Association of Japan for shipments of more than 250,000 units. It eventually ranked seventeenth on the 2020 Oricon Annual Ranking with 312,404 physical copies sold. Stargazer also debuted first on the Billboard Japan Top Singles Sales, and ranked sixteenth on the chart's year-end edition.

Track listing 
"Oh-Eh-Oh" and "My Friends" are common track 1 and 4, respectively, for limited edition A, limited edition B and normal edition.

Charts

Weekly charts

Monthly charts

Year-end charts

Certifications

Release history

References 

JO1 songs
2020 songs
2020 singles
Billboard Japan Hot 100 number-one singles
Japanese-language songs
Oricon Weekly number-one singles
Albums produced by Hui (singer)